= San Luis Potosí, Mexico =

San Luis Potosí, Mexico, may refer to:

- The state of San Luis Potosí, one of the 32 component federal entities of the United Mexican States
- San Luis Potosí City, capital city of that state
